is a Japanese composer, conductor and multimedia creator.

Education
Born in 1962, Aizawa graduated from metropolitan Tokyo Hibiya High School, the Tokyo National University of Fine Arts and Music, and a graduate school composition course with a full national scholarship. He then studied in Berlin and the Vienna National Music School, and Hochschule in a conducting course."紳士録" , "Japanese Who's Who" 80th edition

He has done ecriture study with Yuzuru Shimaoka and Koichi Uzaki, composition study with Akira Miyoshi, Teruyuki Noda and Makoto Shinohara, and conducting study with Francis Travis, Julius Kalmer and Seiji Ozawa (Gusthorer).UMBC Profile

Works
Signifiant pour orchestra (1988, Tokyo)
Kouro-zen Shakuhachi solo (1991, Tokyo)
Tou-sei  Shakuhachi, oh-kawa (1998, Tokyo)
Su-ohu  Japanese instrument ensemble (1998, Tokyo)
Ride Solo Ichigen-kin (2001, France)
Phase IIc  Cl., Cor., SQ (2005, Tokyo)
Temp de temp Cl., Perc. (2007, Washington DC)
Deposition Shakuhachi, Vn., Vc., Cl., Perc., Pf (2007, Washington DC)
Shiso-chou Shakuhachi, live-electronics (2008, Japan)Works by Japanese composers by Suntory culture foundation

Books
Music of Japan Today Chapter 4; Cambridge Scholars Publishing (2008),

References

External links
umbc.edu profile

1962 births
20th-century classical composers
20th-century conductors (music)
20th-century Japanese composers
20th-century Japanese male musicians
21st-century classical composers
21st-century conductors (music)
21st-century Japanese composers
21st-century Japanese male musicians
Japanese classical composers
Japanese conductors (music)
Japanese male classical composers
Japanese male conductors (music)
Living people
Musicians from Tokyo